Arthur John Langguth (July 11, 1933 – September 1, 2014) was an American author, journalist and educator, born in Minneapolis, Minnesota. He was professor of the Annenberg School for Communications School of Journalism at the University of Southern California. Langguth was the author of several dark, satirical novels, a biography of the English short story master Saki, and lively histories of the Trail of Tears, the American Revolution, the War of 1812, Afro-Brazilian religion in Brazil and the United States, the Vietnam War, the political life of Julius Caesar and U.S. involvement with torture in Latin America.
A graduate of Harvard College (AB, 1955), Langguth was South East Asian correspondent and Saigon bureau chief for The New York Times during the Vietnam war, using the byline "Jack Langguth". He also wrote and reported for Look Magazine in Washington, DC and The Valley Times in Los Angeles, California. Langguth joined the journalism faculty at USC in 1976. He was awarded a Guggenheim Fellowship in 1976, and received the Freedom Forum Award, honoring the nation's top journalism educators, in 2001. He retired from active teaching at USC in 2003.

Langguth lived in Hollywood.

Published works
After Lincoln: How the North Won the Civil War and Lost the Peace Simon & Schuster, 2014
Driven West: Andrew Jackson and the Trail of Tears to the Civil War Simon & Schuster, 2010
Union 1812: The Americans Who Fought the Second War of Independence Simon & Schuster, 2006
Our Vietnam: The War 1954-1975 (Simon & Schuster, 2000), Touchstone Press (paper), 2002
A Noise of War: Caesar, Pompey, Octavian and the Struggle for Rome (Simon & Schuster, 1994)
Patriots, The Men Who Started the American Revolution (Simon & Schuster, 1988); Touchstone Press (paper), 1989, 2002
Saki, A Life of Hector Hugh Munro (Simon & Schuster, New York, 1981);(Hamish Hamilton, London, 1981); (Oxford University Press [paper],1982.) Figueroa Press (Los Angeles, 2003)[paper]
Hidden Terrors (Pantheon Books, New York, 1978); Pantheon (paper), 1979; Portuguese language translation, 1979; Circulo do Livro, Brazilian book club edition, 1983; Russian language edition, Moscow, 1985
Macumba, White and Black Magic in Brazil (Harper & Row, 1975)
Marskman (fiction) (Harper & Row, 1974)
Wedlock (fiction) (Alfred A. Knopf, 1972); Ballantine Books [paper], 1973
Jesus Christs (fiction) (Harper & Row, 1968); (Victor Gollancz, London, 1968); Ballantine Books [paper], 1969; Figueroa Press (Los Angeles, 2003)[paper]

See also 
History of Uruguay
History of Brazil (1964-1985)
Lincoln Gordon
Office of Public Safety (OPS)

References

External links
A.J. Langguth's personal website

1933 births
2014 deaths
American male writers
Writers from Minneapolis
Historians of the Vietnam War
Harvard College alumni
University of Southern California faculty
20th-century American historians